Santorini is an island in the Aegean Sea, part of an archipelago of the same name.

Santorini may also refer to:

People
 Al Santorini (born 1948), American baseball player
 Giovanni Domenico Santorini (June 6, 1681 – May 7, 1737), Italian anatomist

Arts, entertainment, andmedia
 Santorini (game), a strategic board game
 Santorini (novel), by Alistair MacLean
 "Santorini", a song from Yanni's 1986 album Keys to Imagination

Watercraft
 Santorini, a boat captured during the Santorini affair in 2002
 MV Express Santorini, a ferry

Other uses
 Santorini (wine), a Greek wine
 Duct of Santorini, a part of the human pancreas
 Roman Catholic Diocese of Santorini
 Santorini tomato, a tomato cultivar

See also
List of names derived from Santoro